Homer Griswold Barber (November 25, 1830March 10, 1909) was a Michigan politician.

Early life
Homer G. Barber was born on November 25, 1830 in Benson, Vermont to parents Edward Hinman Barber and Rebecca Barber. In 1839, Homer moved with his parents to Vermontville, Michigan. His parents were among the original colonists of Vermontville, and he grew up on their farm there. There, he was educated at the Vermontville Academy.

Career
Around 1849, Barber served as a clerk for the postmaster in Kalamazoo. A year after this, in 1850, Barber went to California for the gold rush. He sailed to California, going under Cape Horn on the route. Barber mined in California for two years before returning to Vermontville. Barber used the profit from this endeavor to start a successful career as a merchant. In 1861, Barber was appointed the Postmaster of Vermontville, a position he held for eleven years. On November 4, 1870, Barber was elected to the Michigan Senate, where he represented the 20th district from January 4, 1871 to December 31, 1872. In 1872, Barber engaged in banking, establishing his own private village bank. From 1872 to 1873, Barber served as trustee of Vermontville. In 1874, Barber served as village president of Vermontville. Barber served again as village president of Vermontville from 1876 to 1879. Barber served as a Vermontville school board trustee in 1880.

Personal life
On March 23, 1853, Barber married Lucy Clarissa Dwight. Together, they had three children. Barber also adopted one daughter. Barber was widowed upon Lucy's death on May 1, 1893. On April 7, 1894, Barber remarried to Gertrude E. Wood. Barber was a Congregationalist, and was said to have a "liberal views on religion." Barber was a Freemason.

Death
In February 1909, Barber contracted influenza, which lead to his deteriorating health. Barber died on March 10, 1909. He was interred at Woodlawn Cemetery in Vermontville on March 12.

References

1830 births
1909 deaths
American bankers
American Congregationalists
American Freemasons
American merchants
Burials in Michigan
Michigan postmasters
Republican Party Michigan state senators
People from Benson, Vermont
People from Eaton County, Michigan
People of the California Gold Rush
School board members in Michigan
19th-century American politicians
19th-century American businesspeople